is a retired Nippon Professional Baseball player from Kariya, Aichi, Japan. He played as an outfielder for the Hanshin Tigers.

Akahoshi announced his retirement on December 9, 2009. During the 2009 season, he was first deactivated in early July after sustaining a neck injury. Then, on September 12, his last game, Akahoshi aggravated a spinal disc herniation when he dove headfirst in an attempt to catch a ball. He was diagnosed with spinal damage and has experienced pain in his neck and lower back as well as numbness in his hands and feet since.

References

External links

Living people
1976 births
People from Kariya, Aichi
Baseball people from Aichi Prefecture
Asia University (Japan) alumni
Japanese baseball players
Nippon Professional Baseball outfielders
Hanshin Tigers players
Nippon Professional Baseball Rookie of the Year Award winners